Mombin-Crochu is a commune in the Vallières Arrondissement, in the Nord-Est department of Haiti. It has 25,113 inhabitants.

Communal sections 
The commune consists of two communal sections, namely:
 Sans Souci, urban and rural
 Bois Laurence, urban and rural, containing the town of Bois Laurence

References

Populated places in Nord-Est (department)
Communes of Haiti